is a Japanese sprinter who specializes in the 200 metres.

Iizuka started to compete in track and field after winning a local 100 metre competition when he was in third grade; the coach of a local club scouted his performance in this race and brought him to join his track and field club. He attended Fujieda Meisei High School and then Chuo University, where he studied law.

At the 2010 World Junior Championships in Athletics, Iizuka won the 200 metres title with a time of 20.67 seconds, making him the first Japanese male sprinter to win a medal in the event.

At the 2016 Summer Olympics, Iizuka won a silver medal in the 4 × 100 metres relay. He has won a total of eight medals (three gold, four silver, one bronze) in international athletics competitions.

Personal bests

Records
200 metres
Current Japanese university record holder – 20.21 s (wind: +1.4 m/s) (Fukuroi, May 3, 2013)
4×100 m relay
Current Asian and Japanese record holder – 37.60 s (relay leg: 2nd) (Rio de Janeiro, August 19, 2016)
Current Japanese university record holder – 38.44 s (relay leg:2nd) (Tianjin, October 9, 2013)

 with Ryōta Yamagata, Yoshihide Kiryū, and Asuka Cambridge
 with Ryōta Yamagata, Asuka Cambridge, and Kazuma Ōseto

Competition record

National Championship

References

External links

 
 Shōta Iizuka at JAAF 
 Shōta Iizuka at Mizuno Track Club 
 
 Shōta Iizuka on Blog

1991 births
Living people
Sportspeople from Shizuoka Prefecture
Japanese male sprinters
Olympic male sprinters
Olympic athletes of Japan
Olympic silver medalists for Japan
Olympic silver medalists in athletics (track and field)
Athletes (track and field) at the 2012 Summer Olympics
Athletes (track and field) at the 2016 Summer Olympics
Medalists at the 2016 Summer Olympics
Asian Games gold medalists for Japan
Asian Games silver medalists for Japan
Asian Games bronze medalists for Japan
Asian Games medalists in athletics (track and field)
Athletes (track and field) at the 2014 Asian Games
Athletes (track and field) at the 2018 Asian Games
Medalists at the 2014 Asian Games
Medalists at the 2018 Asian Games
Universiade medalists in athletics (track and field)
Universiade silver medalists for Japan
Universiade bronze medalists for Japan
Competitors at the 2011 Summer Universiade
Medalists at the 2013 Summer Universiade
World Athletics Championships athletes for Japan
World Athletics Championships medalists
Japan Championships in Athletics winners
Athletes (track and field) at the 2020 Summer Olympics
20th-century Japanese people
21st-century Japanese people